Carignano is a comune (municipality) in the Metropolitan City of Turin in the Italian region Piedmont, located about  south of Turin.

Carignano borders the following municipalities: Moncalieri, Vinovo, La Loggia, Piobesi Torinese, Villastellone, Castagnole Piemonte, Osasio, Lombriasco and Carmagnola.

The Sanctuary of Valinotto, a masterwork by the architect Bernardo Vittone, lies within the territory of the town.

See also
Carignane

References

External links

Official website